The 1980 Milan Indoor, also known by its sponsored name Ramazzotti Cup, was a men's tennis tournament played on indoor carpet courts at the Palazzo dello Sport in Milan, Italy. The event was part WCT Tour which was incorporated into the 1980 Volvo Grand Prix circuit. It was the third edition of the tournament and was held from 24 March through 30 March 1980. First-seeded John McEnroe won the singles title.

Finals

Singles
 John McEnroe defeated  Vijay Amitraj 6–1, 6–4
 It was McEnroe's 3rd singles title of the year and the 18th of his career.

Doubles
 Peter Fleming /  John McEnroe defeated  Andrew Pattison /  Butch Walts 6–4, 6–3

References

External links
 ITF tournament edition details

Milan
Milan Indoor
Milan Indoor
Milan Indoor